Necessary Evil may refer to:

Ethics
 Necessary evil, an evil that must be allowed for a greater good to result
 Lesser of two evils principle

Film and television 
 The Necessary Evil, a 1925 American silent film
 Necessary Evil (2008 film), an American thriller film
 Necessary Evil: Super-Villains of DC Comics, a 2013 documentary film
 "Necessary Evil" (Star Trek: Deep Space Nine), a television episode
 "A Necessary Evil" (In the Heat of the Night), a television episode
 "A Necessary Evil" (Xena: Warrior Princess), a television episode

Music

Albums
 Necessary Evil (Deborah Harry album) or the title song, 2007
 Necessary Evil (Salem album), 2007

Songs
 "Necessary Evil", by Armand Van Helden from 2 Future 4 U
 "Necessary Evil", by Balance of Power from Heathen Machine
 "Necessary Evil", by Body Count from Born Dead
 "Necessary Evil", by the Dresden Dolls from Yes, Virginia...
 "Necessary Evil", by Hans Zimmer from The Dark Knight Rises film soundtrack
 "Necessary Evil", by Motionless in White from Graveyard Shift
 "Necessary Evil", by Napalm Death from Enemy of the Music Business
 "Necessary Evil", by Nikki Yanofsky from Little Secret
 "Necessary Evil", by Unknown Mortal Orchestra from Multi-Love

Other uses
 Necessary Evil (aircraft), a B-29 Superfortress used in the 1945 atomic bomb attack on Hiroshima
 Necessary Evil (comics), a 2019–2020 Power Rangers crossover event
 Necessary Evil, a role-playing game campaign setting by Savage Worlds
 Necessary Evil, a comic published by Desperado Publishing
 A Necessary Evil, a Stargate audiobook
A Necessary Evil, novel by Abir Mukherjee